Eleven ships of the French Navy have borne the name Liberté, in honour of the concept of Liberty.

Ships 
  (1792), a felucca
 , a 74-gun , was renamed to Liberté during her career
  (1793), a floating battery captured from the Dutch
 , a small craft
 , a brig
 Salamine (1793), a Spanish prize brig, bore the name Liberté during her French career
 , a 16-gun corvette
 , a corvette
 , a gunboat, bore the name Liberté during her career
  (1907), a pre-dreadnought battleship, lead ship of her class
 , an auxiliary submarine hunter

See also 
 
  (1797), a lugger.
  (1800), an 8-gun bombship.

Notes and references

Notes

References

Bibliography 
 
 

French Navy ship names